Zeng Peiyan (born December 1938) is a Chinese politician.  He was a member of the Politburo of the Chinese Communist Party from 2002 to 2007 and was a Vice-premier from 2003 to 2008.

Early life and career
Zeng Peiyan was born in Shaoxing, Zhejiang Province. He graduated from Tsinghua University in 1962. Zeng joined the Chinese Communist Party in 1978.

Post-political life
Following his post as Vice Premier of the State Council, Zeng has been serving as Chairman of the China Center for International Economic Exchanges, a think tank with the mission of promoting international economic research and exchanges and providing consulting service. In 2009, he also became a member of the International Advisory Council of the sovereign wealth fund China Investment Corporation.

2013 Taiwan visit
In end of February 2013, Zeng, in his capacity as the Chairman of the mainland-based China Center for International Economic Exchanges visited Taiwan for five days in which he delivered a speech during a Cross-Straits Entrepreneurs’ Forum at the Grand Hotel in Taipei. His visit came at the invitation of Vincent Siew, the Chairman of the Cross-Straits Common Market Foundation. Zeng met representatives from Taiwan’s industrial and commercial circles, and will also tour around the region to get a better understanding of the latest developments to the island's economy.

References 

1938 births
Living people
Politicians from Shaoxing
People's Republic of China politicians from Zhejiang
Members of the 16th Politburo of the Chinese Communist Party